Lesia Viktorivna Tsurenko (born 30 May 1989) is a Ukrainian tennis player. Tsurenko has won four singles titles on the WTA Tour, as well as six singles and eight doubles tournaments on the ITF Women's Circuit. On 18 February 2019, she reached her best singles ranking of world No. 23. On 28 May 2018, she peaked at No. 115 in WTA the doubles rankings.

Career

2013: Australian Open third round, top 60 debut 
In 2013, Tsurenko reached the semifinals of the WTA Premier Brisbane International tournament, after entering the draw as a lucky loser replacing Maria Sharapova; she defeated Jarmila Gajdošová and Daniela Hantuchová before losing in three sets to Anastasia Pavlyuchenkova. Having qualified for the main draw of the Australian Open, she again faced Pavlyuchenkova, the 24th seed. This time Tsurenko won in three sets. She then beat fellow qualifier Daria Gavrilova in the second round, but lost to Caroline Wozniacki in the third. Tsurenko continued her good run of form on the North American hardcourts, as she reached the third round at the Indian Wells Open as a qualifier; she defeated Ayumi Morita and Yaroslava Shvedova before falling to Petra Kvitová. She reached a new career-high ranking of No. 60 in the world.

2014: Loss of form
After nearly falling out of the world's top 200 prior to Wimbledon in 2014, Tsurenko experienced a mid-career revival. After qualifying for Wimbledon, she defeated Dinah Pfizenmaier to set up a second-round meeting with Simona Halep; Tsurenko pushed the No. 2 seed to three sets before losing out on a possible third-round appearance. She did, however, proceed to reach her first final on the ITF Circuit in nearly two years, losing the Vancouver Open final to Jarmila Wolfe, in three sets. She also reached the semifinals of the Tashkent Open before losing to eventual champion Karin Knapp. Her late-season run ensured she'd finish inside the top 100 for the second year in a row.

2015: First WTA Tour title
In 2015, Tsurenko reached the quarterfinals of the Indian Wells Open, again as a qualifier, defeating Annika Beck, Andrea Petkovic, Alizé Cornet and Eugenie Bouchard before retiring against Jelena Janković in the quarterfinals due to an ankle injury she suffered in defeating Bouchard. After again reaching the second round of Wimbledon and losing to Irina-Camelia Begu, Tsurenko won her first WTA singles title in Istanbul, defeating Urszula Radwańska in final. As a result, she reached a career-high ranking of world No. 47. She qualified for the Canadian Open in Toronto by beating Nicole Gibbs and Lara Arruabarrena, and then defeated Yanina Wickmayer, Wimbledon finalist Garbiñe Muguruza and Carina Witthöft, before succumbing to Sara Errani in the quarterfinals.

Her good form continued at the Connecticut Open. As a lucky loser, replacing Simona Halep, she defeated fifth seed Karolína Plíšková in straight sets in the quarterfinals. In the semifinals, she eventually lost to French Open finalist Lucie Šafářová. Tsurenko found revenge one week later at the US Open, defeating the sixth seed Šafářová in the first round. However, she lost to Varvara Lepchenko in round two.

2016: First Grand Slam fourth-round appearance
After a struggle in the first half of the year, Tsurenko made her first major fourth round at the US Open, after beating Irina-Camelia Begu and Dominika Cibulková, before losing to defending finalist Roberta Vinci. Two weeks later, she won her second WTA Tour singles title in Guangzhou, defeating Jelena Janković in the final.

2017: Third WTA Tour title & top 30 debut
Tsurenko won her WTA third singles title in Acapulco, defeating Kristina Mladenovic in final. After Wimbledon, she reached a new career-high ranking of No. 29.

2018: Fourth WTA Tour title, first major quarterfinal
She defended her title in Acapulco as her fourth singles title by beating Stefanie Vögele in the final. In Cincinnati, she made her first Premier Mandatory quarterfinal appearance in three years, after beating Danielle Collins, Garbiñe Muguruza, and Ekaterina Makarova en route, before losing to Simona Halep. At the US Open, she reached her first Grand Slam quarterfinal after beating Alison Van Uytvanck, Caroline Wozniacki, Kateřina Siniaková, and Markéta Vondroušová, before losing to eventual champion Naomi Osaka. Tsurenko thus set a new career-high of 26 in singles.

2019: First WTA 500 final, top 25 debut
Beginning her 2019 year at the Brisbane International, she reached the final with wins over Mihaela Buzărnescu, Australian wildcard player Kimberly Birrell, Anett Kontaveit, and second seed Naomi Osaka. She lost in the championship match to fifth seed Karolína Plíšková. Seeded 24th at the Australian Open, Tsurenko was defeated in the second round by Amanda Anisimova.

In February at the Qatar Ladies Open, she lost in the second round to top seed and eventual finalist Simona Halep. At Dubai, she was defeated in the third round by third-seeded Simona Halep. Seeded 24th at the Indian Wells Open, Tsurenko made it to the third round where she lost to ninth seed Aryna Sabalenka.

Tsurenko started her clay-court season at the Porsche Tennis Grand Prix in Germany. She was defeated in the first round by German wildcard Laura Siegemund. At the Madrid Open, Tsurenko lost in round one to fourth seed Angelique Kerber. Playing at the Italian Open, she was defeated in the first round by Yulia Putintseva. Seeded 27th at the French Open, Tsurenko reached the third round in which she lost to third seed and defending champion Simona Halep.

2020-2021: Loss of form out of top 100
Tsurenko kicked off her 2020 season at the Shenzhen Open where she lost in the first round to third seed Elise Mertens. At the Australian Open, Tsurenko was defeated in the first round by top seed Ashleigh Barty.

Seeded fourth at the first edition of the Zed Tennis Open, an ITF tournament in Egypt, Tsurenko reached the final where she lost to third seed Irina-Camelia Begu. At the Qatar Open, she was defeated in the first round of qualifying by Greet Minnen. Playing the Indian Wells Challenger, Tsurenko made it to the semifinals but lost to Irina-Camelia Begu, who would end up winning the title.
No tournaments were played from April to July 2020 due to the COVID-19 pandemic.

When play resumed in August, Tsurenko competed at the 2020 Prague Open. Coming through qualifying, she upset fifth seed Ekaterina Alexandrova in the first round. She then withdrew from her second-round match against Ana Bogdan.

Tsurenko started the 2021 season at the first edition of the Gippsland Trophy where she lost in the first round to Aliaksandra Sasnovich. At the 2021 Australian Open, she fell in the final round of qualifying to Liudmila Samsonova. Playing at the first edition of the Phillip Island Trophy, Tsurenko was defeated in the qualifying round by Mona Barthel. However, she was awarded a lucky loser spot into the main draw but was eliminated in the first round by Patricia Maria Țig. In Adelaide, she was beaten in the first round of qualifying by Australian Astra Sharma.

2022: WTA 500 quarterfinal & major third round on grass
Tsurenko lost 0–6, 1–6 to then-world number one and eventual champion, Ashleigh Barty, in the first round of the Australian Open. At the French Open, Tsurenko qualified into her second major main-draw debut where she was drawn to face current world No. 1, Iga Swiatek, in her opener.

During the grass-court season, Tsurenko achieved positive results. At Eastbourne, she reached the quarterfinals as a qualifier but withdrew before her match with Beatriz Haddad Maia. At Wimbledon, she reached the third round for a second time defeating compatriot Anhelina Kalinina.

At the Budapest Grand Prix, she reached the quarterfinals defeating Kamilla Rakhimova in 3 hours and 53 minutes, in the longest match of the season and seventh-longest match of the Open Era, but retired against third seed Yulia Putintseva.

2023: First final since 2019, back to top 100, WTA 1000 third round
She reached her first  final since 2019 and sixth overall in Hua Hin, Thailand after the retirement of top seed Bianca Andreescu. She lost to Lin Zhu in the final. As a result she returned to the top 100 on 6 February 2023.

At the 2023 BNP Paribas Open she qualified for the main draw and reached the third round defeating Lin Zhu and 29th seed Donna Vekic but withdrew from her match against Aryna Sabalenka citing personal reasons. She explained later that she had a panic attack after speaking with the WTA CEO. She lost by retirement or walkover in nine of her 18 tournaments dating back to Indian Wells from the previous year.

Career statistics

Grand Slam performance timelines

Singles

Tsurenko won all three rounds of qualifying for the 2021 Wimbledon Championships and qualified for the main draw, but withdrew before her first-round match. This is not counted as a loss.

Doubles

References

External links

 
 
 

1989 births
Living people
Ukrainian female tennis players
Sportspeople from Rivne Oblast
21st-century Ukrainian women